Großbeeren is a municipality in the district of Teltow-Fläming in the German state of Brandenburg.

Geography
Located about 3 km south of Berlin's city limits. It includes the localities of Diedersdorf, Heinersdorf and Kleinbeeren.

Demography

History

Großbeeren was first mentioned in a 1271 deed. It was devastated in the Thirty Years' War and again in 1760, when Russian and Habsburg troops in the course of the Seven Years' War burnt down the church and several houses.

On 23 August 1813 the Sixth Coalition under Crown Prince Charles John of Sweden and General Friedrich Wilhelm Freiherr von Bülow defeated three corps of the Imperial French Army under Marshal Nicolas Oudinot in their advance on Berlin at the Battle of Großbeeren. A memorial tower in the village centre was erected on the hundredth anniversary in 1913. Furthermore, a fieldstone pyramid from 1906 on a pasture west of Großbeeren is dedicated to General von Bülow.

In September 1942 the Gestapo established a labour camp in Großbeeren, where at least 1197 forced labourers from Belgium, Czechoslovakia, France, Poland, Nazi Germany and the Soviet Union were killed. Werner Seelenbinder was imprisoned here in 1943.

Großbeeren shared its borders with the former West Berlin, and so during the period 1961-1990 it was separated from it by the Berlin Wall.

The municipality houses the Institute of Vegetable and Ornamental Crops (IGZ) of the Gottfried Wilhelm Leibniz Scientific Community.

Transport
Großbeeren can be reached via the Bundesstraße 101 federal highway. It has also access to the Berlin–Halle railway. A large logistics complex serves for storage and distribution of goods addresses to Berlin.

Personalities 
 Johannes Reinhold (1897-1971), director of the Institute of Vegetable Production in Großbeeren
 Helmut Barthel (born 1953), politician (SPD), lives in Großbeeren
 Michael Richter (born 1954), politician (CDU) lives in Großbeeren

References

Localities in Teltow-Fläming
Teltow (region)